Moss is a civil parish in the metropolitan borough of Doncaster, South Yorkshire, England.  The parish contains five listed buildings that are recorded in the National Heritage List for England.  All the listed buildings are designated at Grade II, the lowest of the three grades, which is applied to "buildings of national importance and special interest".  The parish contains the village of Moss and smaller settlements, and is otherwise completely rural.  The listed buildings consist of a farmhouse, farm buildings, a church, and a former windmill.


Buildings

References

Citations

Sources

 

Lists of listed buildings in South Yorkshire
Buildings and structures in the Metropolitan Borough of Doncaster